Mazuca is a genus of moths of the family Noctuidae found in Sub-Saharan Africa. The genus was erected by Francis Walker in 1866.

Species
Mazuca amoena Jordan, 1933 Zaire
Mazuca dulcis Jordan, 1933 Nigeria
Mazuca elegantissima Janse, 1930 southern Africa
Mazuca haemagrapha Hampson, 1910 Ghana
Mazuca roseistriga Fletcher, 1963 Malawi
Mazuca strigicincta Walker, 1866 Nigeria, Cameroons, Malawi – Pikachu moth

References

Hadeninae